Alexander Grant Dallas (25 July 1816 – 3 January 1882) was a Chief Factor in the Hudson's Bay Company and superintendent of the Columbia District and New Caledonia from 1857 to 1861, then superintendent of Fort Garry in what was to become Manitoba from 1862 to 1864.  He was later the Governor of Rupert's Land. He married Jane Douglas, a daughter of the Governor of the Colony of Vancouver Island, James Douglas, on 9 March 1858.

References

External links
Biography at the Dictionary of Canadian Biography Online

1816 births
1882 deaths
Canadian fur traders
Hudson's Bay Company people
Chief factors
People of Rupert's Land
Pre-Confederation British Columbia people